Torodora sagmaria is a moth in the family Lecithoceridae. It was described by Kyu-Tek Park in 2002. It is found in Cambodia and Thailand.

The wingspan is about 14 mm. The forewings are brownish and the hindwings are grey.

Etymology
The species name refers to the shape of the 8th segment and is derived from Greek sagma (meaning pack, saddle).

References

Moths described in 2002
Torodora